Jappeloup is a 2013 Canadian-French film directed by Christian Duguay. In January 2014, Lou de Laâge was nominated for the Most Promising Actress award at the 39th César Awards.

Plot
In the early 1980s, Pierre Durand, Jr. resigns from his career as a lawyer and becomes a professional equestrian, focusing on show jumping.

Durand loses at the 1984 Summer Olympics in Los Angeles, California. However, at the 1988 Summer Olympics in Seoul, South Korea, he wins.

Cast
Guillaume Canet as Pierre Durand, Jr.
Marina Hands as Nadia
Daniel Auteuil as Serge Durand
Lou de Laâge as Raphaëlle Dalio
Tchéky Karyo as Marcel Rozier
Jacques Higelin as Dalio
Marie Bunel as Arlette Durand
Joël Dupuch as Francis Lebail
Frédéric Épaud as Patrick Caron
Arnaud Henriet as Frédéric Cottier
Donald Sutherland as John Lester
Antoine Cholet as Hubert Bourdy
Edmond Jonquères d'Oriola as Philippe Rozier
Benoît Petitjean as Éric Navet
Sébastien Cazorla as Michel Robert
Noah Huntley as Joe Fargis
James Flynn as John Lester's son
Xavier Alcan as Sponsor
Sonia Ben Ammar as young Raphaele
Jean Rochefort as himself

Critical reception
It was shown at the COLCOA film festival in Los Angeles, California in 2013.

For The Hollywood Reporter, the film offers "a rather classic mix of stunts and sentiment before galloping ahead to its stirring equine finale."

References

External links
 
 

2013 films
French drama films
Canadian drama films
Films shot in Mallorca
Films about the 1984 Summer Olympics
Films about the 1988 Summer Olympics
Films about Olympic equestrian sports
Films about horses
Films directed by Christian Duguay (director)
2013 drama films
2010s French-language films
French-language Canadian films
2010s Canadian films
2010s French films